Skaal may refer to:

 Skål, a toast in some Scandinavian languages
 Skaal, a faction in The Elder Scrolls video game series
 Lars Skåål (born 1949), Swedish water polo player

See also 
 Norges Skaal, a Norwegian anthem